Rhynchospora baldwinii, known by the common name of Baldwin's beaksedge, is a member of the sedge family, Cyperaceae. It is found in riverbanks and swampland near the coasts of the southeastern United States, as far west as New Orleans and as far north as Morehead City in North Carolina.

References

External links

baldwinii
Flora of the Southeastern United States
Flora of Florida
Plants described in 1835